Colombier-Saugnieu is a commune in the Rhône department in eastern France. Since 2008, Pierre Marmonier has been the mayor of Colombier-Saugnieu. He was re-elected in the 2020 municipal elections.

Geography
The river Bourbre forms part of the commune's eastern border. Lyon–Saint-Exupéry Airport and Lyon-Saint-Exupéry TGV station are in the commune. It is part of the public transport zone of Rhônexpress.

Education
The city has one primary school, Groupe Scolaire Jules Ferry.

See also
Communes of the Rhône department

References

External links

 Home page 

Communes of Rhône (department)